John Stewart (1786-1823) was a missionary to the Wyandot Indians of Ohio and founder of what is often considered the first Methodist mission in America. Stewart was born in Powhatan County, Virginia to free Negro parents who were of mixed ancestry; a mix of white, black, and Indian (specifically Saponi and possibly Chickahominy and/or Accomac).

References

http://www.bu.edu/missiology/missionary-biography/r-s/stewart-john-1786-1823/

1786 births
1823 deaths
Wyandot County, Ohio
American Methodist missionaries
Methodist missionaries in the United States
People from Powhatan County, Virginia